Kristiyan Hristiyanov (born 11 September 1978) is a Bulgarian footballer currently playing for Nesebar as a forward.

External links 
  footballdatabase.eu profile

1978 births
Living people
Bulgarian footballers
FC Chernomorets Burgas players
FC Dunav Ruse players
First Professional Football League (Bulgaria) players
Association football forwards
People from Shumen